The Australian Armour and Artillery Museum is a privately-owned museum dedicated to tanks, armoured vehicles and artillery from the Second World War and post war periods. It was officially opened in 2014, in Cairns, Queensland, Australia.

The museum has purchased a number of vehicles and items for display from overseas, including some items from the Littlefield Collection when it was downsized. It is the largest collection of military vehicles in Australia, and the only major collection of vehicles in Australia apart from the Royal Australian Armoured Corps Memorial and Army Tank Museum at Puckapunyal. It is one of the largest private collections of artillery and AFVs in the world.

The museum houses vehicles from a number of overseas manufacturers, including vehicles from Russia, Germany, Japan, the UK, the US and Czechoslovakia.

Collection 

The museum houses artillery dating back to World War I and vehicles from World War II and the post war period. All up the collection owns more than 100 vehicles, with more than 190 exhibits on display. A number are also in various stages of restoration and transit. The collection features a range of armoured vehicles including German, US, Australian, British and Russian examples.

US vehicles 

US vehicles in the collection include both an early model and later model Stuart, M47 Patton, M48 Patton, M110 self-propelled gun, M3 Lee, M3 Grant, Sherman M4A1, White half-track, Staghound, M52 105mm SPG, LVT4 landing vehicle, M114 Command and Reconnaissance vehicle, M577A1 Command Vehicle (ex Australian Army), M113A1 (ex Australian army), White M3 half-track, Staghound Anti-Aircraft variant, M3 Grant "local farm conversion", M36 Jackson, M7 Priest and M41 Walker Bulldog.

Australian vehicles 

The collection houses two rare Sentinel tanks (AC1 and AC4), Dingo scout car,  Local Pattern 2 Carrier, 2 Pdr Attack Carrier Yeramba self-propelled 25 pounder, LP4 Armoured Car, M113 fire support vehicle, S1 (American) Scout car and a 2-pounder Portee on a Blitz truck.

British vehicles 

Archer, Saladin (two), Chieftain, Humber Armoured Car, Matilda II, WWII British artillery tractor, Sherman Firefly, Churchill Mk VII, Churchill Flail, Churchill AVRE, Centurion, Valentine tank, Saracen, Ferret Mk 2, Fox, FV433 Abbot SPG, Sabre, Bar Mine Layer, Matilda II with Mk3 No.1 Bulldozer blade.

Russian vehicles 

Soviet artillery tractor, BMP1, T-55, T26, T34/85, T60, T70, T72, BTR152, SU76, SU100, ISU152, Pion 2S7 203mm SPG, BTR60 Command version, ATL Artillery Tractor, SA-2 (Surface to Air Missile) and a 2S1 Gvozdika and a rare KV1 under restoration.

German vehicles 

Panzer 38(t), Jagdpanzer 38(t), Pz.Kpfw. III Ausf J, Pz.Kpfw. VI "Tiger" (plus a replica from the film "Fury"), Hummel, Leopard 1, Kanonenjagdpanzer, Pz.Kpfw. IV Ausf D, Pz.Kpfw. IV Ausf E, Pz.Kpfw. IV Ausf G, Pz.Kpfw. IV Ausf J, Jagdpanther, Kettenkraftrad(Sd.Kfz. 2), Sd.Kfz. 250/3 Ausf A, Sd.Kfz. 250/3 Ausf B, Sd.Kfz 250/8, Sturmgeschütz III Ausf A, Sturmhaubitze 42, Beobachtungpanzer Artillery Observation Vehicle, Sd.Kfz. 251/1 Ausf D, Sd.Kfz. 251/9 Ausf C, Sd.Kfz. 251/22, Sd.Kfz. 11/1, Pz.Kpfw. V Ausf A "Panther", Jagdpanzer IV, Sturmgeschütz IV and a Raupenschlepper Ost RSO mit Pak 40.

A Sturmgeschütz III Ausf G is undergoing restoration and is not on display.

Other countries 
 
Other vehicles from other countries include a Canadian Ram Kangaroo, Czech OT810, Canadian Lynx, French Panhard AML, Ford Gun Tractor with Australian Limber and British 25 pdr, and Czech Praga with 30mm AA gun

Vehicles not on display 

Additionally, there are a number of vehicles owned by the museum, but not currently on display. Mostly these are still being prepared in workshops, either on site or overseas, or they are in transit to the Museum. These include a Cromwell Medium Tank, a Goliath tracked mine and close to another 25 additional planned exhibits.

AusArmourfest 

Every year, to celebrate the Museums birthday, the Museum hosts a three day event called AusArmourfest. AusArmourfest gives people the opportunity to go for rides in some of the operational vehicles. In past years, some of the vehicles operated have included the Hetzer, T72, Panzer IV G, Leopard, Kettenkrad, and Sabre.

Donation of Australian Tank From Wargaming Inc 

The museum hosts two rare Australian Cruiser tanks (two of six left in the world), an AC1 Sentinel and a hybrid AC1 with an AC3 turret, presented as an AC4. The AC1 Sentinel was purchased and given to the museum by Wargaming Inc, producer of the World of Tanks tank game. The Sentinel was in the United States at the Littlefield Collection when that collection sold off many of its vehicles, and Wargaming Inc desired to purchase it and return it to its original home. As part of the purchase, it allowed access to the tank by Wargaming, so that they could study it and replicate it accurately for their game.

Shooting gallery and workshop 

The Museum site also includes a 50-metre shooting gallery and a repair/restoration workshop where the vehicles which are in a state of deterioration can be restored. The workshop has a number of staff and can modify and build vehicles. As of 2015, the site has expanded to house more vehicles.

Tiger 1 replica 

In 2016, the museum workshop undertook construction of a Tiger 1 replica. This utilised a highly accurate, partially constructed Tiger 1 that was originally constructed for the movie Fury, which in itself was an accurate replica of Tiger 131. The reconstruction utilised that upper portion of the Tiger, and also referenced original Tiger parts the museum had purchased to make the whole tank. The bottom chassis was strengthened to be able to run, the first time the museum had produced its own tank from scratch. The Tiger reproduction uses a Scania truck engine. The running gear is T55 (Track, support arms and torsion bars) M110 Road wheels and the drive/ steering component is from a T62, but it is outwardly a running, almost completely accurate Tiger 1, except for the front drive sprocket, which due to the T62 transfer case sits 200mm too high,  and T55 Track. It was completed in November 2016, and is the only reproduction tank of this scale to be completed in Australia.

See also  
National Military Vehicle Museum
Royal Australian Armoured Corps Memorial and Army Tank Museum
The Army Museum Bandiana
Bundeswehr Museum of German Defense Technology – Koblenz, Germany
Deutsches Panzermuseum – Munster, Germany
Musée des Blindés – Paris, France
Royal Tank Museum – Amman, Jordan
The Tank Museum – Bovington, United Kingdom
United States Army Ordnance Museum
Polish Army Museum – Warsaw, Poland

References

External links
 Australian Armour and Artillery Museum – official site
 New Tank Museum Opens – media report. Includes images

Military and war museums in Australia
Tank museums
Transport museums in Queensland
Buildings and structures in Cairns